Françoise-Marie Jacquelin (1621–1645) was an Acadian heroine and wife of Charles de Saint-Étienne de la Tour.

Biography

Françoise-Marie Jacquelin was born and baptized on July 18, 1621 in Nogent-le-Rotrou. According to Charles de Menou d'Aulnay, Jacquelin was the daughter of an actress in Paris. According to others, she was the daughter of a doctor, or of a businesswoman.

In 1640 she sailed from France to Port Royal to marry de la Tour. They settled at Fort la Tour at the mouth of the Saint John River.

Jacquelin quickly became involved in the Acadian Civil War, her husband's struggle with Charles de Menou d'Aulnay for control of Acadia. She evaded a blockade d'Aulnay had established and returned to France to plead her husband's case to the king. She returned to Acadia with a warship laden with supplies for Fort la Tour.

In 1645, while la Tour was in Boston, d'Aulnay attacked the fort. Jacquelin assumed command of the garrison there, refused to surrender, and led a pitched three-day battle to defend the fort. On the fourth day, with the walls of the fort breached and having taken heavy casualties, Jacquelin surrendered. D'Aulnay executed the surviving soldiers. Madame de La Tour was forced to watch the hangings. She died three weeks later.

See also 
Military history of Nova Scotia

References

1602 births
People from Nogent-le-Rotrou
1645 deaths
Acadian people
Women in war in Canada
Women in 17th-century warfare
Military history of Acadia